Altun Kupri Sport Club, is an Iraqi football team based in Altun Kupri, Kirkuk, that plays in Iraq Division Three.

Managerial history
 Ezzedine Askar 
 Mahmoud Majeed
 Tariq Tumah

See also 
 2020–21 Iraq FA Cup

References

External links
 Altun Kupri SC on Goalzz.com
 Iraq Clubs- Foundation Dates

2002 establishments in Iraq
Association football clubs established in 2002
Football clubs in Kirkuk